The Deep Purple European Tour was a year-long successful concert tour by British hard rock band Deep Purple, lasting from July 1969 until June 1970. The band played mostly United Kingdom shows, also covering West Germany, Switzerland, Denmark, the Netherlands and Belgium. It was the first tour to feature the classic Deep Purple line-up: Ian Gillan, Roger Glover, Ritchie Blackmore, Jon Lord and Ian Paice. It is considered to be the pre-tour for the In Rock album, as the band mostly played songs from the upcoming album.

Tour pre-history
In 1969, cofounders Ritchie Blackmore and Jon Lord decided to replace vocalist Rod Evans with Ian Gillan. Gillan declined to join Purple without his former bandmate Roger Glover. Lord and Blackmore accepted and, in 1969, Gillan and Glover, replaced Evans and bassist Nick Simper. This new line-up, known as MKII, immediately went on tour throughout Europe and the United Kingdom.

"I remember back in 1969 when Roger and I did our first show with Purple at the Speakeasy," recalled Gillan. "There were only twelve people there; well, twenty if you counted Keith Moon. But I looked at Roger and said, 'Oh man, this is it.' It was the kind of band we had both been dreaming of."

Tour dates

Setlist
During the tour, half of the setlist included MKI hits with the other half consisting of new MKII songs. "Speed King", "Child in Time" and "Into the Fire" were premiered on the tour, before being released on the In Rock album.

And the Address {opening bars only}
Kneel and Pray (early version of Speed King with different lyrics)
Into the Fire
Kentucky Woman (only occasionally)
Child in Time
Mandrake Root
Wring That Neck aka Hard Road
Ritchie's Blues
Paint It Black, instrumental (The Rolling Stones cover)
~Drum solo

Tour diary & notable live dates
Deep Purple MKII kicked off their first tour at the London Speakeasy Club. In a recent interview, Ian Gillan named this show to be favourite live performance of his career, as it was his first show with Deep Purple.

After a few United Kingdom dates, the band headed to Belgium, where they headlined Jazz Bilzen, and then again returned to the United Kingdom.

On 24 September, the band played at London's Royal Albert Hall, with the London Symphony Orchestra conducted by Malcolm Arnold. This was one of the earliest examples of a rock band collaborating with an orchestra.  The show was called Concerto for Group and Orchestra and was later officially released. The Concerto and album itself was influential, with many rock bands following in Deep Purple's steps and playing with orchestras. Rock band Metallica made their orchestral debut in 2000 and named Purple's 1969 show as the main influence.
The orchestral parts were written by Jon Lord and included three movements.

Opening set – first part (without Orchestra):
Hush
Wring That Neck
~Jingle Bells instrumental
Child In Time

Concerto For Group And Orchestra (second part)
First Movement – Allegro moderato
Second Movement – Andante
Third Movement – Vivace presto
~Drum solo

Encore:
Third Movement (2nd half)
~Drum solo

In April 1969, Deep Purple headlined the Montreux Jazz Festival in Switzerland as well as the Pop & Blues festival in West Germany. Other festival acts included Pink Floyd and The Nice. Ritchie Blackmore jammed with The Nice's Keith Emerson

On 19 February, they performed at the BBC's Studios, with the show later being released on CD. They then returned to West Germany, Switzerland and Austria, before again returning to the UK.  The tour ended at Frankfurt's Radstadion on 21 June 1970.

Live albums and DVDs
Several live albums from the tour were later released.
Concerto for Group and Orchestra CD/DVD
Gemini Suite Live CD
Kneel & Pray CD
Live in Montreux 69 CD
Scandinavian Nights CD/DVD
Deep Purple in Concert CD/DVD
Live in Stockholm CD/DVD
Space Vol 1 & 2
Doing Their Thing DVD
Heavy Metal Pioneers (Tour documentary)

Line up
Ian Gillan – vocals
Ritchie Blackmore – lead guitar
Jon Lord – keyboard, hammond organ
Roger Glover – bass guitar
Ian Paice – drums

References

External links
Deep Purple setlists – 1969–2005
List of all Deep Purple gigs – full gigography
Deep Purple Tour Page – 1968-2010

Deep Purple concert tours
1969 concert tours
1970 concert tours